Alex Gordon (25 July 1940 – 18 February 1996) was a Scottish footballer, who played for Dundee United, Bradford Park Avenue and St Johnstone.

References

External links 

1940 births
1996 deaths
Sportspeople from Livingston, West Lothian
Association football wing halves
Scottish footballers
Armadale Thistle F.C. players
Dundee United F.C. players
Bradford (Park Avenue) A.F.C. players
St Johnstone F.C. players
Ross County F.C. players
Scottish Football League players
English Football League players
Footballers from West Lothian